Faery Wicca is a modern tradition of Wicca founded by author Kisma Stepanich. Adherents of Stepanich's Faery Wicca claim that it recovers the traditions of the Tuatha De Danaan, the mythological precursors to the Celtic people; however, this is disputed by those familiar with ancient Celtic polytheism and mythology. Stepanich's Faery Wicca draws liberally on some degree of Irish mythology, from the author's interpretation of Celtic history, legend, pseudohistory, imagination, and a variety of non-Celtic sources.

Faery Wicca is not related to the late Victor Anderson's Feri Tradition of witchcraft, which is sometimes also spelled Faery or Fairy, nor is it directly related to the gay men's group, the Radical Faeries.  Though Faery Wicca may draw inspiration from some of the customs practiced among the ancient and modern Celts, it shares more with other modern Wiccan traditions than with the "Fairy Faith" as it is known in traditional Gaelic cultures.

See also
 Faerie faith
 Celtic Wicca

References

Wiccan traditions